Quarta Divisão is a 2013 Portuguese film directed by Joaquim Leitão.

Cast
 Carla Chambel
 Sabri Lucas
 Paulo Pires
 Cristina Câmara

References

External links

Portuguese thriller films
2013 films
Films directed by Joaquim Leitão
2010s Portuguese-language films